Black Sails: The Ghost Ship is an adventure game developed by Deck 13 Interactive and originally published by Astragon Software on Apr 22, 2010 for Windows.

Plot and gameplay 
In the year 1884, the player is an investigator trying to solve a mystery. When her ship capsizes, she and another survivor are rescued by a strange abandoned ship.

The game uses the game engine as that used for Ankh and Jack Keane.

Development 
The game was released internationally onto Steam in September 2015. Jan Klose, Creative Director for Deck 13, said "With the resurgence in popularity of adventure games, we felt the time was right to bring Black Sails-The Ghost Ship to a North American audience".

Critical reception 

4Players deemed it a "truly interactive thriller". Adventure Treff praised the title for not artificially extending its run-time with unnecessary sidequests. ComputerBild praised the game''s three alternate endings that allowed the player to have agency. AdventureGamers felt the voice acting was just passable. Gamestar praised the subtle use of soundscape to create a sense of tension and drama. Die Hard Game Fan thought he game was let down by its poor plot, presentation, and mechanics. Spieltipps felt that lovers of Deck 13's Ankh would be disappointed by  this title. Pressa2Join thought the game had a good story, well told. CommonSenseMedia noted the game may not be suitable to children due to a moment of implied rape or sexual assault toward a young girl. Tiscali felt that the game's classic-ness meant it also added nothing new to the genre.

References

External links 

 Press release
 DemonNews review
 Modern home page
 Gamezone.de press

2010 video games
Adventure games
Video games developed in Germany
Video games set in the 19th century
Windows games
Windows-only games